Holliday Creek is a stream in Wayne County in the U.S. state of Missouri. It is a tributary to the St. Francis River within Lake Wappapello.

The stream flows southwest passing southeast of Greenville and enters the waters of Lake Wappapello.

Holliday Creek has the name of Hiram Holliday, a businessperson in the local lumber industry.

See also
List of rivers of Missouri

References

Rivers of Wayne County, Missouri
Rivers of Missouri